Vladimir Chikolev (23 July 23 [4 August], 1845, Peski - 22 February [6 March], 1898, St Petersburg) was a Russian scientist who specialised in electrical engineering. He founded the company Elektrotekhnik.

References

1845 births
1898 deaths